Jingde may refer to:

Jingde County (旌德县), Xuancheng, Anhui, China
Jingde, Guangxi (敬德镇), town in Debao County, Guangxi, China
Jingde (景德; 1004–1007), era name of Emperor Zhenzong of the Song dynasty

See also
Jingdezhen (景德镇市), prefecture-level city of Jiangxi, China